Route 175 is a major north–south highway on both sides of the St. Lawrence River in Quebec, Canada. Its southern terminus is in Saint-Lambert-de-Lauzon at the junction of Route 218 and its northern terminus is in Saguenay at the junction of Route 172, in the former city of Chicoutimi. Route 175 crosses the Saint Lawrence River on the Quebec Bridge, and a little further north of downtown Quebec City, it merges with Autoroute 73 for about 30 km before continuing through the Laurentides Wildlife Reserve as a two-lane divided highway in Stoneham.

Part of Route 175 is built to autoroute standards; the major part of that autoroute portion, also known as Autoroute Laurentienne, overlaps Autoroute 73.  However the southern extremity of Autoroute Laurentienne, which is not part of A-73, is also designated as Autoroute 973.

The stretch of highway between Stoneham and Saguenay was considered one of the most dangerous highways in the province due to it being two-lane and subject to poor weather conditions. Collisions, including those with moose, are not uncommon. After lengthy negotiations between the Québec and federal governments to fund the project, work was begun to completely rebuild Route 175 as a four-lane dual carriageway. It was started in 2003 and completed in September 2013.

Halfway between Quebec City and Saguenay is L'Étape, a rest area and campground featuring a gas station, restaurant and dépanneur.

Municipalities

 Saint-Lambert-de-Lauzon
 Levis
 Quebec City
 Stoneham-et-Tewkesbury
 Lac-Jacques-Cartier
 Lac-Pikauba
 Lac-Ministuk
 Saguenay

See also
List of Quebec provincial highways

References

External links 
 Interactive Provincial Route Map (Transports Québec) 
 Route 175 on Google Maps

175
Laurentides Wildlife Reserve